The Rio dos Frades Wildlife Refuge is a wildlife refuge in the state of Bahia, Brazil.
It protects the land around the mouth of the Frades River. There is pressure, or opportunity, to develop the reserve for tourism.

Location

The Rio dos Frades Wildlife Refuge is in the municipality of Porto Seguro, Bahia.
Nearby conservation units include the Pau Brasil National Park to the north, and the Monte Pascoal National Park and Corumbau Marine Extractive Reserve to the south.
The reserve is within the Caraíva-Trancoso State Environmental Protection Area, defined on 24 November 2000.

Environment

The reserve is on a sandy coastal plain bounded by a cliff inland.
It is in the  drainage basin of the Frades River, and protects the mouth of the river.
The vegetation is mainly restinga salt marsh, with shrubs and thickets. 
There are mangroves and many  bromeliads and orchids.
There is an endemic lizard named Cnemidophorus nativo.

The reserve is threatened by construction on private properties, which cover most of the reserve, and by Buffalo incursions.
Tourism is being developed in the region, and the small beach at the river mouth may be attractive.
Tourism has potential economic value for the local residents.
The local people of Itaporanga use the reserve to access the beach and the river mouth for leisure and for fishing.

History

On 15 May 2006 the Brazilian Institute of Environment and Renewable Natural Resources (IBAMA) began public consultations on the proposed creation of the Rio dos Frades and Una wildlife refuges, as well as the proposed expansion of the Pau-Brazil and Descobrimento national parks and of the Una Biological Reserve.

The Rio dos Frades Wildlife Refuge was created by federal decree on 21 December 2007 with the basic objective of preserving natural ecosystems of great ecological relevance and scenic beauty, enabling scientific research, education and environmental interpretation and supporting recreation in contact with nature.
It is classed as IUCN protected area category III (natural monument or feature).
It is administered by the Chico Mendes Institute for Biodiversity Conservation.
It became part of the Central Atlantic Forest Ecological Corridor, created in 2002.

The consultative council was created on 21 July 2011.
The consultative council included representatives of ICMBio and landowners, but the landowners were not actively participating due to lack of interest. 
As of 2014 the reserve had no management plan and was therefore not open to visitors.

Notes

Sources

Wildlife refuges of Brazil
Protected areas of Bahia
2007 establishments in Brazil